Louisa Coffee is a Taiwanese  coffeehouse chain.  The company began as a small coffee to-go shop in Taipei. In December 2019, it surpassed Starbucks as the chain with the most locations in Taiwan. Their first overseas location was opened in Bangkok, Thailand in March, 2019.

History

In 2022, Lypid partnered with Louisa Coffee to bring plant-based burger patties to over 500 of their branches.

References 

Coffeehouses and cafés
Restaurant chains in Taiwan
Taiwanese brands
Food and drink companies established in 2006
Companies listed on the Taipei Exchange